The 2002 Sharjah Cup Triangular Series was a One Day International (ODI) cricket tournament held in the United Arab Emirates in April 2002. It was a tri-nation series between the national representative cricket teams of the Sri Lanka, New Zealand and Pakistan. Pakistan won the tournament by defeating Sri Lanka by 217 runs in the final. All matches were held at Sharjah Cricket Stadium.

Squads

Lou Vincent was initially named in New Zealand's ODI squad, but withdrawn due to chest injury. Mathew Sinclair was added to the squad for Vincent.

Matches

1st ODI

2nd ODI

3rd ODI

4th ODI

5th ODI

6th ODI

Final

References

External links
 Series home at ESPN Cricinfo

Sharjah Cup
Sharjah Cup
Sharjah Cup
International cricket competitions in 2001–02